"Here to Stay" is a Grammy Award-winning song by American nu metal band Korn that appears on the band's fifth studio album, Untouchables as the album's opening track. It was released as the album's first single in June 2002.  The song won the 2003 Grammy Award for Best Metal Performance, as well as winning an award for Best International Video on MuchMusic in 2002. It was also nominated for Best Rock Video at the 2002 MTV Video Music Awards and Best Single at the 2002 Kerrang! Awards. The music video, directed by The Hughes Brothers was highly successful, and gained frequent airplay on MTV and MuchMusic in particular, featuring the band members on a TV screen amongst major world issues at the time.  The video won a 2002 Metal Edge Readers' Choice Award for Music Video of the Year. The song has become a staple of the band's live show to this day. Dizzee Rascal samples this song on his single, "Sirens" from his album, Maths + English.

Release and reception
"Here to Stay" was released to US radio stations in February 2002 as a promotional single. The retail version was released on the same day as Untouchables, June 11, 2002. A box set was later released, which included all three editions of the "Here to Stay" single. There is also a one-track promotional single of the Mindless Self Indulgence remix, which is difficult to find. This remix is also found on the DVD single of "Thoughtless".

Electronic musician BT also remixed the song that same year.

"Here to Stay" was Korn's first single to enter the Billboard Hot 100, peaking at #72. It has also been widely considered to be one of Korn's best songs. In 2019, Loudwire ranked the song number five on their list of the 50 greatest Korn songs, and in 2021, Kerrang ranked the song number three on their list of the 20 greatest Korn songs.

Live performance
In the concert version of the song, small changes are made to the song, such as the guitar riff played by Head in the background being removed during the outro of the song. The line "fucked up feelings again" in the pre-chorus of the song is often left for the audience to sing instead of Davis while rest of the band members momentarily stop playing their instruments in order to hear the fans' voices more clearly.

Track listing
CD single:
 "Here to Stay" – 4:31

DVD single:
 "Here to Stay" (Extended video)
 "Here to Stay" (Short video)

EP:
 "Here To Stay - T Ray's Mix"
 "Here To Stay - T Ray's Mix Instrumental"
 "Here To Stay - BT's Managed Anger Mix"
 "Here To Stay - BT-Korn Instrumental"
 "Here To Stay - Remixed By MINDLESS SELF INDULGENCE"
 "Here To Stay - Tone Toven And Sleep Remix"

Music video
The music video, directed by the Hughes Brothers, portrays a boy watching subliminal messages on TV while flipping channels between shows (which consist of real-world events) and the band playing in the TV against a static backdrop. In the end, Jonathan takes the boy into the TV. The video for "Here to Stay" also marks the first video appearance of Jonathan's unique microphone stand designed by H. R. Giger. There is also a "clean" version of the music video which shows the boy being taken into the TV at the beginning. This version omitted the explicit words and all of the real-event videos. The point of view is "inside" the TV instead of outside it. This version is the one shown at Sony BMG's official YouTube channel.

Appearances in media
The song is featured on the soundtrack to the 2002 video game ATV Offroad Fury 2.
Featured in the adverts of the Spanish TV channel Cuatro, during the UEFA Euro 2008. In the adverts, Spain striker Fernando Torres and goalkeeper Iker Casillas are shown fighting with robots to win the ball. A small sample of the beginning of the song (the main riff) can be heard at the end of the advert.
Professional boxer Kelly Pavlik used the song as his entrance music.
American sports channel NESN used the intro of the song on a highlight reel.
This song is featured on an episode of Pimp My Ride International, Season 1 episode 4.

Charts

References

External links

Korn songs
2002 singles
Grammy Award for Best Metal Performance
Songs written by Reginald Arvizu
Songs written by Jonathan Davis
Songs written by James Shaffer
Songs written by David Silveria
Songs written by Brian Welch
2002 songs
Epic Records singles
Song recordings produced by Michael Beinhorn